The diplomatic relations between the Portuguese Republic and the Islamic Republic of Iran date back to the 16th century, following the establishment of the Portuguese State of India.

History 

The first interactions between Portugal and Iran date back to the 16th century, during the period of the Safavid dynasty, when a Portuguese armada led by Afonso de Albuquerque stormed and captured Ormuz in 1507, capturing the city. From that moment on, the two countries initiated a period of intense interaction, with multiple embassies and envoys sent by the two nations. In 1513, Afonso de Albuquerque, as governor of Portuguese India, sent Miguel Ferreira and João Ferreira to Persia, as ambassadors to the Shah Ismail of Persia.

During the 20th century, the relations between the two countries were renewed, with the first Portuguese consulate in Tehran opening in December 1932, which was followed by a Portuguese Legation in the same city on 11 May 1956, which would eventually become an embassy. On 15 October 1956, the Envoy Extraordinary and Minister Plenipotentiary of Portugal in Ankara, Luís Norton de Matos, presented his credentials as Non-resident Ambassador in Tehran, becoming the first diplomatic representative of Portugal in Iran in the modern era.

Throughout the first two decades of the 20th century, the relations between the two countries intensified, several bilateral agreements were signed, and a number of official visits by officials from both countries occurred. In 2008, the 500th anniversary of the relations between the two countries was celebrated.

Bilateral agreements 

Several bilateral agreements have been signed by the two countries, including:

 Financial Protocol, signed on 10 October 1993.
 Agreement for Cooperation in the Fields of Language, Education, Culture, Sports, Youth, Tourism and Media, signed on 26 January 2015
 Agreement on the suppression of Visas for holders of Diplomatic, Special or Service Passports, signed on 22 April 2017

Furthermore, numerous Memorandums of Understanding were signed between different Ministries of the two countries, regarding cooperation in the fields of Education, Culture, Science, Technology, Sports, Tourism, Historical and Patrimonial Documentation, Agriculture and Political Consultations.

High-level visits 

Over the last decades, several high level visits took place, including the following:

Visits from Portuguese officials to Iran

 7–11 October 2014, Jorge Barreto Xavier, Secretary of State for Culture
 23–26 January 2015, Rui Machete, Minister of State and Foreign Affairs
 15–18 September 2015, Nuno Viera de Brito, Secretary of State for Food and Agri-food Research
 27–31 May 2016, Jorge Costa Oliveira, Secretary of State of Internationalization
 17–24 April 2017, Jorge Costa Oliveira, Secretary of State of Internationalization

Visits from Iranian officials to Portugal

 7 January 2003, Khamal Kharazi, Minister of Foreign Affairs
 5 November 2004, Gholamali Khoshroo, Vice-Minister for International Legal Affairs of the Ministry of Foreign Affairs of Iran
 23 January 2008, Manuchehr Motaki Minister of Foreign Affairs
 September 2008, Mohammad Jahromi, Minister of Labour.
 15–17 June 2009, Mehdi Safari, Vice-Minister of Foreign Affairs
 13 July 2010, Manuchehr Motaki, Minister of Foreign Affairs
 18 June 2014, Reza Salehi Amiri Minister of Culture and Islamic Guidance
 15 April 2015, Mohammad Javad Zarif, Minister of Foreign Affairs
 12–13 May 2015, Hassan Ghashghavi, Vice-minister of Foreign Affairs for Consular and Parliamentary Affairs
 12 May 2016, Hassan Ghashghavi Vice-Minister of Foreign, Consular and Parliamentary Relations, and Iranian Affairs

Economic relations 
The two countries maintain a consistent, but modest economic and commercial relationship. The total of goods traded by the two countries in 2019 amounted to 21.99 million dollars, with a surplus from the Portuguese perspective of 5.21 million dollars.

Iran was in 2020 the 104th client of Portuguese exports, with a quota of 0.02% of the total of Portuguese exports in that year, while it was the 130th largest exporter of goods to Portugal, with a quota of 0.002% of the total, in the same period.

The main products exported from Portugal to Iran in 2020 were Agricultural Products, Food Products, Common Metals, Minerals and Ores, and Machinery and other Equipment. In the same year, the main groups of products exported to Portugal by Iran were Minerals and Ores, Agricultural Products and Chemical Products.

Diplomatic missions 

 Portugal has an Embassy in Tehran
 Iran has an Embassy in Lisbon

See also
 Foreign relations of Iran
 Foreign relations of Portugal
 Iran–European Union relations

References 

 
Portugal
Bilateral relations of Portugal